Mongoumba is a town located in the Central African Republic prefecture of Lobaye. In Sub-prefecture Mongoumba, Ombella-M'Poko, Central African Republic.

Sub-prefectures of the Central African Republic
Populated places in Lobaye